Historic Live Tuna is an album by the band Hot Tuna.  It was released in 1985.  Side A contains previously unreleased tracks from a live acoustic performance played on KSAN radio in 1971. Side B contains previously unreleased material from a live electric performance in 1971 recorded at the Fillmore West auditorium in San Francisco.  The album was Hot Tuna's second release on Relix Records, and would be their last release until after the 1989 Jefferson Airplane reunion tour and reunion album, when they were signed to Epic Records for a short time before returning to Relix.

In 1996 the A-side of Historic Live Tuna was expanded and released as the CD Classic Hot Tuna Acoustic, and the B-side was expanded and released as the CD Classic Hot Tuna Electric.

Another song from the Fillmore West concert, "Keep Your Lamps Trimmed and Burning", was included in the album Fillmore: The Last Days.

Critical reception

On AllMusic, William Ruhlmann wrote, "Hardcore Tuna fans will be pleased with the existence on record of these performances by a Hot Tuna that featured Kaukonen (acoustic guitar on side one, electric on side two), Jack Casady, Papa John Creach, and Sammy Piazza. Others may find that the rudimentary sound quality and the generally restrained performing level render this inessential."

Track listing
Side A
"New Song (for the Morning)" (Jorma Kaukonen) – 5:05
"Been So Long" (Kaukonen) – 4:17
"Oh Lord, Search My Heart" (Rev. Gary Davis) – 4:39
"True Religion" (Traditional) – 7:01
"Space Jam" (Jack Casady, Kaukonen) – 0:10
Side B
"Intro by Bill Graham" / "Rock Me Baby" (Traditional) – 9:03
"Want You to Know" (Bo Carter) – 4:58
"Come Back Baby" (Lightning Hopkins) – 9:14

Personnel
Hot Tuna
Jorma Kaukonen – guitars, vocals
Jack Casady – bass
Papa John Creach – violin
Sammy Piazza – drums 
Production
Leslie D. Kippel – producer
Ken Pisani – cover art
Jorma Kaukonen – liner notes

References

Albums recorded at the Fillmore
Hot Tuna live albums
1985 live albums
Relix Records live albums